Liomesaspis is an extinct genus of xiphosuran, related to the modern horseshoe crab. It lived from the late Carboniferous to the Early Permian.

Sources
 Evolution: What the Fossils Say and Why It Matters by Donald R. Prothero and Carl Buell
 Bringing Fossils To Life: An Introduction To Paleobiology by Donald R. Prothero

External links
Xiphosura at Palaeos.com

Fossils of Germany
Xiphosura
Carboniferous arthropods
Permian arthropods
Pennsylvanian first appearances
Cisuralian genus extinctions